The Kent Baronetcy, of Fornham in the County of Suffolk, was a title in the Baronetage of Great Britain. It was created on 16 August 1782 for Charles Kent, later member of parliament for Thetford. The title became extinct on the death of the third Baronet in 1848.

Kent baronets, of Fornham (1782)
Sir Charles Kent, 1st Baronet (–1811)
Sir Charles Egleton Kent, 2nd Baronet (1784–1834)
Sir Charles William Egleton Kent, 3rd Baronet (1819–1848)

References

Extinct baronetcies in the Baronetage of Great Britain